Nicola Acocella (born 3 July 1939) is an Italian economist and academic, Emeritus Professor of Economic Policy since 2014.

In 1963 he graduated in Economics from the “Sapienza University of Rome” with a thesis on ‘Time lags in economic policy’, under the supervision of Federico Caffè. After becoming full professor (1980), he got a reputation for his holistic contribution to systematisation and development of Economic policy. He also introduced remarkable innovations in the theory of economic policy as well as in monetary and fiscal policy and the theory of social pacts.

Academic career 
During his career Prof. Acocella had the opportunity to exchange views or to co-operate with some of the most important economists of the twentieth century, such as Kenneth Arrow, Amartya Sen and Joseph Stiglitz and other eminent professors like Paul De Grauwe, Alexis Jacquemin, Adrian Pagan, Luigi L. Pasinetti, Douglas Hibbs, Andrew Hughes Hallett, Peter J. Hammond.

He has visited, among others, the University of Cambridge, Oxford, Toronto, Harvard, Reading, Stanford as well as the European Union and the United Nations.

He has been Professor of Economics with the University of Perugia; Professor of Industrial organization and Economic Policy at the University of Calabria; Professor of Economic Policy, Sapienza University of Rome. He has also been Head of the Department of Economics, University of Calabria; Head of the Economics Graduate Studies Program, Sapienza University of Rome; Member of the Research Commission, Sapienza University of Rome

Membership and associations 
 Member of the Executive Committee of the ‘Società Italiana degli Economisti’ (EN: ‘Italian Economic Association’) (2007–10).
 Vice-president of the ‘Società Italiana degli Economisti’ (EN: ‘Italian Economic Association’) (2016–)
 Member of the Committee for a full professorship in Macroeconomics, Wirtschaftsuniversität, Vienna (2009).

Research and contributions to economic analysis 
Prof. Acocella has developed his expertise in several research fields. He worked first on industrial organisation and globalization. Among his numerous contributions in this field: a dynamic version of the static limit pricing model by Bain, Modigliani and Sylos Labini and a model for transfer pricing by multinational firms as well as a number of essays on the distributional and employment effects of globalization

He has also contributed to the theory of social pacts, their substitutability with other institutions – such as a conservative central banker – in order to ensure monetary stability, their implementation, with specific reference to the long-term Italian issue of a low productivity dynamics.

He has also investigated monetary and fiscal policy, both in abstract terms (dealing in particular with: conditions for their effectiveness, existence of a non vertical long-run Phillips curve, optimal inflation rate) and with reference to the European institutional architecture (optimality of co-ordinated fiscal action and monetary policy orientation).

A final path of analysis has led him to lay down a systematic approach to economic policy as a discipline to some extent autonomous from the rest of economic science, by enquiring on the various needs to heal market failures as well as the directions and the design of public policy.

About one of his contributions the Nobel prize Amartya Sen has said:

Of specific interest is his reformulation (together with Giovanni Di Bartolomeo and Andrew Hughes Hallett) of the classical theory of economic policy laid down by Jan Tinbergen, Theil and Ragnar Frisch in a setting immune from Lucas critique. This offers a novel contribution to the analysis of conditions not only for policy effectiveness or neutrality (showing the limits of validity of many currently accepted propositions on the effects of rational expectations and time inconsistency as well as on the role of policy announcements), but also for existence, uniqueness or multiplicity of the equilibrium in strategic games. The theory is of use also in an institutional perspective as a theory of conflict resolutions and optimal institution setting.

Notable publishing activities 
Referee for various journals and international institutions. Among them: Cambridge University Press,  Canadian Journal of Economics, Journal of Macroeconomics, Journal of Public Economic Theory, Scottish Journal of Political Economy, United Nations.

Honours and fellowships 
 First Medal from the University of Rome ‘La Sapienza’ for 'excellence research' in the theory of economic policy in a strategic context (2009).
 Fellow of the British Academy (1977)
 Fellow of the Canadian Social Sciences and Humanities Research Council (1980)
 Fellow of the American Council of Learned Societies (1980)
 Evaluator for EU research projects (2008, 2010, 2012)

List of publications 
A selection of his published works follows:

Monographs in English language 
 Acocella, N. [1998], ‘The foundations of economic policy. Values and techniques’, Cambridge University Press, Cambridge, p. 519, translated into Chinese, Polish, Croatian, .
 Acocella, N. [2005], ‘Economic policy in the age of globalisation’, Cambridge University Press, Cambridge, p. 509, .
 Acocella, N. and Leoni, R. (eds.) [2007], ‘Social pacts, employment and growth: a reappraisal of Ezio Tarantelli’s thought’, Springer Verlag, Heidelberg, .
 Acocella, N., Di Bartolomeo, G. and Hughes Hallett, A. [2013], ‘The theory of economic policy in a strategic context’, Cambridge University Press, Cambridge, .
 Acocella, N., Di Bartolomeo, G. and Hughes Hallett, A. [2016], ‘Macroeconomic paradigms and economic policy. From the Great Depression to the Great Recession’, Cambridge University Press, Cambridge, .
 Acocella, N. [2018], ‘Rediscovering Economic Policy as a Discipline’, Cambridge University Press, Cambridge, .
 Acocella, N. [2020], ‘The European Monetary Union: Europe at the Crossroads’, Cambridge University Press, Cambridge, .

Main monographs in Italian language 
 Acocella, N. [1975], ‘Imprese multinazionali e investimenti diretti. Le cause dello sviluppo’, Giuffrè, Milano.
 Acocella, N. [1983], ‘L'impresa pubblica italiana e la dimensione internazionale: il caso dell'IRI’, Einaudi, Torino, .
 Acocella, N. [1994], ‘Fondamenti di politica economica. Valori e tecniche’, Nuova Italia Scientifica, Roma, (5th ed., Carocci, Rome, 2011), .
 Acocella, N. [1999], ‘Politica economica e strategie aziendali’, Carocci, Roma (5th ed., 2012).

Main articles in English language 
 Acocella, N. [1992], ‘Trade and direct investment within the EC: The impact of strategic considerations’, in: Cantwell, J. (ed.), ‘Multinational investment in modern Europe’, E. Elgar, Cheltenham.
 Acocella, N. and Ciccarone, G. [1997], ‘Trade unions, non neutrality and stagflation’, in: ‘Public Choice’, 91(2): 161–178.
 Acocella, N. and  Di Bartolomeo, G. [2006], ‘Tinbergen and Theil meet Nash: controllability in policy games’, in: ‘Economics Letters’, 90(2): 213–18.
 Acocella, N. [2006], ‘Distributive issues in the provision and use of global public goods’, in: ‘Studi economici’, 88(1): 23–42.
 Acocella, N., Di Bartolomeo, G. and Tirelli, P. [2007], ‘Monetary conservatism and fiscal coordination in a monetary union’, in: ‘Economics Letters’, 94(1): 56–63.
 Acocella, N. and Di Bartolomeo, G. [2007], ‘Is corporatism feasible?’, in: ‘Metroeconomica’, 58(2): 340–59.
 Acocella, N., Di Bartolomeo, G. and Tirelli, P. [2007], ‘Fiscal leadership and coordination in the EMU’, in: ‘Open Economies Review’, 18(3): 281–9.
 Acocella, N., Di Bartolomeo, G. and Hughes Hallett, A. [2007], ‘Dynamic controllability with overlapping targets: or why target independence may not be good for you’, in: ‘Macroeconomic Dynamics’, 11(2): 202–13.
 Acocella, N., Di Bartolomeo, G. and Hibbs, D.A. [2008], ‘Labor market regimes and the effects of monetary policy’, in: ‘Journal of Macroeconomics’, 30: 134–56.
 Acocella, N., Di Bartolomeo, G. and Tirelli, P. [2009], ‘The macroeconomics of social pacts’, in: ‘Journal of Economic Behavior & Organization’, 72(1): 202–13.
 Acocella, N., Di Bartolomeo, G. and Piacquadio, P.G. [2009], ‘Conflict of interest, (implicit) coalitions and Nash policy games’, in: ‘Economics Letters’, 105(3): 303–05.
 Acocella, N., Di Bartolomeo, G. and Hughes Hallett, A. [2010], ‘Policy games, policy neutrality and Tinbergen controllability under rational expectations’, in: ‘Journal of Macroeconomics’, 32(1): 55–67.
 Acocella, N., Di Bartolomeo, G. and Hughes Hallett, A. [2011], ‘Tinbergen controllability and n-player LQ-games’, in: ‘Economics Letters’, 113(1): 32–4.
 Acocella, N. [2011], ‘The deflationary bias of exit strategies in the EMU countries’, in: ‘Review of economic conditions in Italy’, 2–3: 471–93.
 Acocella, N. and Di Bartolomeo, G. [2011], ‘The cost of social pacts’, in: ‘Bulletin of Economic Research’, (doi: 10.1111/j.1467-8586.2011.00405.x).
 Acocella, N., Di Bartolomeo, G. and Hughes Hallett, A. [2012], ‘A general theory of controllability and expectations anchoring for small-open economies’, in: ‘Journal of International Money and Finance’, 31(2): 397–411.
 Acocella, N., Di Bartolomeo, G. and Hughes Hallett, A. [2012], ‘Expectations dynamics: policy, announcements and limits to dynamic inconsistency’, in: ‘Studies in Nonlinear Dynamics & Econometrics’, 16(2), DOI: 10.1515/1558-3708, April.
 Acocella, N., Di Bartolomeo, G. and Hughes Hallett, A. [2012], ‘Central banks and economic policy after the crisis: what have we learned?’, ch. 5 in: Baker, H.K. and Riddick, L.A. (eds.), ‘Survey of International Finance’, Oxford University Press.
 Acocella, N., Di Bartolomeo, G. and Tirelli, P. [2012], ‘Inflation targets and endogenous markups in a New Keynesian model’, in: ‘Journal of Macroeconomics’, 34(2): 391–403.
 Acocella, N., Di Bartolomeo, G. and Hughes Hallett, A. and Piacquadio, P.G. [2014], ‘Announcement wars as an equilibrium selection device’, Oxford Economic Papers 66(1): 325-347.
 Di Bartolomeo , G., Tirelli P., Acocella, N. [2014], ‘Trend inflation, the labor market wedge, and the non-vertical Phillips curve’, Journal of Policy Modeling, 36(6): 1022-1035.
 Di Bartolomeo , G., Tirelli P., Acocella, N. [2015], ‘The comeback of inflation as an optimal public finance tool’, International Journal of Central Banking, 11(1): 43-70. 
 Acocella, N. [2017], ‘Rise and decline of economic policy as an autonomous discipline: A critical survey’, Journal of Economic Surveys, 31(3): 661-902, 10.1111/joes.12168. 
 Hughes Hallett, A., Acocella, N. [2017], ‘Stabilization and expanded commitment: A theory of forward guidance for economies with rational expectations’, Macroeconomic Dynamics, 2016 (Cambridge.org).
 Acocella, N. [2020], ‘How to reform the EU and EMU’, Economia Internazionale/International Economics, 73(3), 325-350.

Main articles in Italian language 
 Acocella, N. [1976], ‘I prezzi di trasferimento nelle imprese multinazionali: problemi di analisi e di politica’, in: ‘Note Economiche’, n. 6.
 Acocella, N. [1979], ‘L'equilibrio oligopolistico in un contesto dinamico’, in: ‘Note Economiche’, n. 5.
 Acocella, N. and Ciccarone, G. [1995], ‘Moderazione salariale e scambio politico: un'analisi micro fondata’, in: ‘Rivista Italiana di Economia’, numero zero, ottobre.
 Acocella, N., Leoni, R. and Tronti, L.[2006], ‘Per un nuovo patto sociale sulla produttività e sulla crescita’, http://www.pattosociale.altervista.org.
 Acocella, N. and Leoni, R. [2010], ‘La riforma della contrattazione: redistribuzione perversa o produzione di reddito? ’, in: ‘Rivista italiana degli Economisti’, 2: 237–74.
 Acocella, N. [2013], ‘Teoria e pratica della politica economica: l’eredità del recente passato’, Rivista di Storia Economica, August 2013, 29 (2): 221-46.

See also 
 List of economists
 Sapienza University of Rome
 Federico Caffè
 Bruno de Finetti
 Luigi Einaudi
 Ragnar Frisch
 Adrian Pagan
 Edmund Phelps
 Henri Theil
 Jan Tinbergen

References

External links 
 
 Profile on the “IDEAS”RePEc service hosted by the Research Division of the Federal Reserve Bank of St. Louis Department

1939 births
Living people
People from Calitri
Academic staff of the Sapienza University of Rome
Sapienza University of Rome alumni
Fellows of the British Academy
Academics of the University of Oxford
Academics of the University of Cambridge
Academics of the University of Reading
20th-century Italian economists
21st-century Italian economists
20th-century Italian writers
21st-century Italian writers
Writers from Campania
Public economists
Labor economists
Macroeconomists
Microeconomists
Monetary economists